Travels in Atomic Sunshine: Australia and the Occupation in Japan is a history book by Robin Gerster dealing with the Australian contribution to the British Commonwealth Occupation Force.

References

History books about World War II